Mangi is a small village approx. 20 km from Bhusawal in district Jalgaon of Maharashtra state, India. Its 8.1 km from Faizpur and 8.2 kmfrom Savda

References 

Villages in Jalgaon district